James Stanton Hall (2 January 1903 – 20 May 1929) was an Indian sprinter. He competed at the 1924 and 1928 Summer Olympics.

References

External links
 

1903 births
1929 deaths
Athletes from Kolkata
Anglo-Indian people
People from British India
Indian male sprinters
Athletes (track and field) at the 1924 Summer Olympics
Athletes (track and field) at the 1928 Summer Olympics
Olympic athletes of India